Tupambaé is a village (pueblo) in the Cerro Largo Department of eastern Uruguay.

Geography
The railroad track Montevideo - Melo pass through the south part of the village.

History
Its status was elevated to "Pueblo" category on 19 August 1926 by the Act of Ley Nº 7.984.

Population
In 2011, Tupambaé had a population of 1,122.
 
Source: Instituto Nacional de Estadística de Uruguay

Places of worship
 St. Joseph Parish Church (Roman Catholic)

References

External links
INE map of Tupambaé

Populated places in the Cerro Largo Department